Mara Elizabeth Karlin is an American foreign policy and defense advisor. In April 2021, President Joe Biden nominated Karlin to serve as the Assistant Secretary of Defense for Strategy, Plans and Capabilities. She was confirmed by the U.S. Senate by voice vote on August 9, 2021. Previously, she served as the Acting Assistant Secretary of Defense for International Security Affairs. In her role, she served as the main advisor to Secretary of Defense Lloyd Austin on U.S. security policies related to every country in Europe, the Middle East, Africa, Eurasia, and the Western Hemisphere. Her portfolio included shaping U.S. defense policy related to NATO.

Education 
Karlin holds a bachelor’s degree from Tulane University and master’s degree and a Ph.D. in Strategic Studies from Johns Hopkins University's School of Advanced International Studies.

Career 
Karlin began her career in government as a non-political civil servant in the Office of the Secretary of Defense. She later became the Deputy Assistant Secretary of Defense for Strategy and Force Development during the Obama Administration. In that capacity, she helped develop the 2015 National Security Strategy and the 2014 Quadrennial Defense Review.

Upon leaving the Obama administration, Karlin returned to her alma mater, Johns Hopkins University's School of Advanced International Studies, to first become the Deputy Director of the Strategic Studies Department and later its Director until leaving academia for government. 

In January 2021, Karlin was appointed to serve as the Principal Deputy Assistant Secretary of Defense for International Security Affairs. The position did not require Senate confirmation, and she began service on January 20, 2021 immediately after President Biden was inaugurated. As the most senior member of the International Security Affairs Office, Karlin became the Acting Assistant Secretary of Defense for International Security Affairs.

In April 2021, the White House announced that President Joe Biden had nominated Karlin as Assistant Secretary of Defense for Strategy, Plans, & Capabilities. Karlin received Senate confirmation on August 9 and was expected to lead the planning process for the Biden Administration's National Defense Strategy.

Karlin is the author of two books, Building Militaries in Fragile States: Challenges for the United States, and The Inheritance: America's Military After Two Decades of War.

External links
Speech at the Center for a New American Security March 2023

References 

Year of birth missing (living people)
Living people
Place of birth missing (living people)
Tulane University alumni
Paul H. Nitze School of Advanced International Studies alumni
United States Assistant Secretaries of Defense
Obama administration personnel
Biden administration personnel